Joseph Holt (1756 – 16 May 1826) was a United Irish general and leader of a large guerrilla force which fought against British troops in County Wicklow from June–October 1798. He was exiled in 1799 to the colony of New South Wales (since 11 Jan 1800, Australia) where he worked as a farm manager for NSW Corp Paymaster Captain William Cox and later returned to Ireland in 1814.

Background
Holt was one of six sons of John Holt, a farmer in County Wicklow. The Holt family were Protestant loyalists in Ballydaniel (Ballydonnell) near Redcross who arrived in Ireland as Elizabethan or planters under James I.

Holt, upon marrying Hester Long [maternally of the Manning ("Oranger") family] in 1782, set himself up as a farmer in the vicinity of Roundwood. He joined the Irish Volunteers in the 1780s and held a number of minor public offices such as an inspector of wool and cloth but became involved in law enforcement as a sub-constable, billet master for the militia and a bounty hunter.
Holt was involved in The Battle of Vinegar Hill which was an engagement during the Irish Rebellion of 1798 on 21 June 1798 when over 15,000 British soldiers launched an attack on Vinegar Hill outside Enniscorthy, County Wexford.

First trial
Despite Holt's apparent loyalism, he became a member of the Society of United Irishmen in 1797 and gradually began to attract suspicion until finally in May 1798, his house was burned down by the militia of Fermanagh, instigated by the local landlord, Thomas Hugo, who owed Holt a sum of money. Holt then took to the Wicklow mountains, gradually assuming a position of prominence with the United Irish, mostly Catholic, rebels. Avoiding pitched battles, Holt led a fierce campaign of raids and ambushes against loyalist military targets in Wicklow, striking at will and reducing government influence in the county to urban strongholds. The defeat of the County Wexford rebels at Vinegar Hill on 21 June saw surviving rebel factions heading towards the Wicklow Mountains to link up with Holt's forces.

Emerging to meet them, Holt was given much of the credit for the planning of the ambush and defeat of a pursuing force of 200 British cavalry at Ballyellis on 30 June 1798. However, the subsequent Midlands campaign to revive the rebellion was a disaster, and Holt was lucky to escape with his life back to the safety of the Wicklow Mountains.

Holt rallied the remaining rebels and continued his United Irish guerrilla campaign as before allegedly even solving gunpowder shortages by inventing his own concoction known as 'Holt's Mixture'. Eluding a number of large-scale sweeps into the mountains by the army following the collapse of the rising, Holt together with his younger rebel Captain Michael Dwyer, tied down thousands of troops and his forces were augmented by a steady supply of recruits, a significant proportion of whom were deserters from the militia.

Surrender
Holt had largely held out in expectation of the arrival of French aid but news of the defeat of the French at the Ballinamuck together with his ill-health brought about by the hardships of his fugitive life, age and family considerations prompted Holt to initiate contact through intermediaries as his wife, Hester Long's sister worked at Powerscourt for Lord Richard Wingfield, 4th Viscount Powerscourt with the Dublin Castle authorities with a view to a negotiated surrender. Dublin Castle was eager to end the rebellion in Wicklow and allow him exile after incarceration in the Bermingham Tower without trial in New South Wales. Bank of Ireland Peter La Touche paid for his pregnant (with Joseph Harrison) wife Hester and first born son Joshua Holt's passage and for their daughter Maryanne to be educated in Ireland.

Transportation

Holt went out on the Minerva, (along with Henry Fulton), and on it met Captain William Cox who had been appointed paymaster of the New South Wales Corps. The ship arrived at Sydney on 11 January 1800, and shortly afterwards Holt agreed to manage Captain Cox's farm. He always claimed in Australia that he was a political exile and not a convict. In September 1800 he was arrested on suspicion of being concerned in a plot against the government, but was soon afterwards released as no evidence could be found against him. He was successful in his management for Cox, and afterwards bought land for himself which eventually yielded him a competence. In 1804 when the Castle Hill uprising occurred Holt, who was not involved, had been warned that evening that it was about to happen.  During the night he set up a defense of Captain Cox's house.  He was nonetheless afterwards hounded by Governor King and many false witnesses brought against him.  Although there was no plausible evidence at all against him, he was in April 1804 exiled by King to Norfolk Island, and there put to hard labour.  In his Memoirs, Holt wrote a considerable amount on the horrors he saw at Norfolk Island under Commandant Joseph Foveaux.  Whereas other histories merely describe Foveaux as some able and efficient administrator who became Lieutenant-Governor at Norfolk Island, Holt saw him far less blandly than that.  Holt graphically described Foveaux as the greatest tyrant that he (Holt) had ever known.  Holt described the joy of the inhabitants of Norfolk Island on the day when Foveaux departed.  He wrote in his Memoirs (Edited by Croker, 1838): "If I could have bought or borrowed a pistol, the world, I think, would soon have been rid of this man-killer, Foveaux, and with as short a warning as he gave to the two men he hung without trial."   After Holt had been there 14 weeks Governor King sent instructions that he should be recalled to New South Wales, but delays occurred and it was not until February 1806 that he arrived back at Sydney again.

Pardon
In June 1809 Holt received a free pardon, but, as this had been given after the arrest of Governor Bligh, it had to be handed in to the government when Governor Macquarie arrived. Holt, however, was officially pardoned on 1 January 1811 and in December 1812, having sold some of his land and stock, with his wife and younger son took passage to Europe on the Isabella; also on board was Henry Browne Hayes. The ship was wrecked by a reef so the passengers and crew were landed at Speedwell Island, one of the Falkland Islands, and Holt showed great resolution and ingenuity in making the best of the conditions on the island. He was rescued on 4 April 1813 but did not reach England until 22 February 1814 as he went via the United States. Holt retired to Ireland where he lived for the rest of his life, but he regretted that he had left Australia. He died at Kingstown now Dún Laoghaire near Dublin on 16 May 1826 and is buried in Carrickbrennan Churchyard at Monkstown. His elder son Joshua Holt married and remained in New South Wales, and the younger son Joseph Harrison Holt also went there via the United States after his father's 1826 death.

Sources and further reading
A Rum Story – The adventures of Joseph Holt – thirteen years in New South Wales. Edited by Peter O'Shaughnessy. Kangaroo Press, 1988
Rebellion in Wicklow: General Joseph Holt's personal account of 1798. Edited by Peter O' Shaughnessy. Four Courts Press, Dublin 1998.
The Year of Liberty: the great Irish rebellion of 1798. Thomas Pakenham. Granada 1982.
Memoirs of Joseph Holt, General of the Irish Rebels in 1798, vols 1–2. T. C. Croker (editor), London, 1838.
'Keeping up the flame' General Joseph Holt. Ruan O' Donnell. History Ireland. Vol. 6. No. 2. 1998.
 Papers of Peter O'Shaughnessy, National Library of Australia.

References

Further reading
 G. C. Bolton, 'Holt, Joseph (1756–1826)', Australian Dictionary of Biography, Volume 1, MUP, 1966, pp 550–551. Retrieved 1 August 2009
 
 Holt Family Fellowship
 

1756 births
1826 deaths
Irish soldiers
Protestant Irish nationalists
Australian people of Irish descent
People from County Wicklow
United Irishmen
People from Dún Laoghaire
Irish guerrillas
Burials in Dublin (county)
Burials at Carrickbrennan Churchyard
Irish Protestants
Convicts transported to Australia